Lakså  is a village in the municipality of Evenes in Nordland county, Norway.

References

Evenes